Kepler-78 (formerly known as KIC 8435766) is a 12th magnitude star in the constellation Cygnus. Initially classified as an eclipsing binary with orbital period 0.710015 days, it was later re-classified as the single star with significant interaction between star magnetosphere and close-in planet. Radius of the star is of about 74% of the Sun, and an effective temperature of about 5100 K.

Planetary system
Kepler-78 planetary system is composed by one planet called Kepler-78b, a planet slightly bigger than Earth with an extremely close orbit to the parent star. The orbital period of this planet is about 8.5 hours because of its proximity to its star. While it has a similar density to the Earth (at 5.57 g/cm3, its surface temperature is about 1300 to 1500 K.

References

Cygnus (constellation)
Planetary systems with one confirmed planet
Planetary transit variables
G-type main-sequence stars